Junttan Oy is a Finnish company that designs and manufactures hydraulic piling equipment. The Junttan product range consists of the world’s leading pile driving rigs, multipurpose piling and drilling rigs, as well as hydraulic impact hammers, rotary heads, and power packs. Combining state-of-the-art piling equipment with uncontested customer service and sheer determination to go great lengths to help customers succeed, Junttan can improve also your operational efficiency.

History
Junttan has over 40 years of experience in developing and manufacturing the industry’s leading piling equipment. The roots of Junttan reach back to the 1960s to a Finnish foundation company called Savon Varvi. Junttan was founded in 1976 by Pentti Heinonen and the first hydraulic piling rig was built in 1979.

1970s 
 Junttan founded in 1976
 The first hydraulic piling rig built in 1979

1980s 
 The famous Junttan PM 20 model range launched in 1983
 The first Junttan rig deliveries outside Finland in 1984
 Export started to Sweden and Denmark in 1984
 The first deep stabilization machine launched in 1988

1990s 
 New HHK-A series of hydraulic hammers launched in 1993
 The first heavy-duty rig PM 26-40 launched in 1996
 Junttan becomes Europe’s leading manufacturer of hydraulic pile driving rigs

2000s 
 A new Junttan factory opened in 2000
 The new HHK-S hydraulic hammer range launched in 2001
 New drilling rig platform launched in 2005
 Junttan became a part of PiloMac group in 2006
 Launching Junttan's biggest hydraulic hammer HHK 25S in 2007
 Manufacturing the 1000th Hydraulic hammer in 2007
 Manufacturing the 500th Piling rig in 2008
 Moving into new production facilities in 2008

2010s 
 The Brotherus family became the majority shareholder of Junttan in 2010
 Launching the new PMx pile driving rig series and SHARK hydraulic hammer concept in 2010
 Acquiring the ExcaDrill rock drilling business unit from Pilomac Oy in 2010
 Acquiring component manufacturing unit from Komas Oy in 2012
 The 40th anniversary of Junttan in 2016

2020s 
Launching the world’s first fully battery-powered electric pile driving rig, PMx2e, in 2021.

Products 
 Pile driving rigs
 Hydraulic impact hammers
 Multipurpose piling machines
 Deep stabilization machines
 ExcaDrill excavator-mounted drill rigs
 Powerpacks
 Hammer accessories
 Rotary heads 
 Rental and Leasing
 Used piling equipment

References

External links
 

Manufacturing companies of Finland
Manufacturing companies established in 1976
Drilling technology
Kuopio